The Philadelphia Phillies are a Major League Baseball team based in Philadelphia, Pennsylvania. They  are a member of the Eastern Division of Major League Baseball's National League. The team has played officially under two names since beginning play in 1883: the current moniker, as well as the "Quakers", which was used in conjunction with "Phillies" during the team's early history. The team was also known unofficially as the "Blue Jays" during the World War II era. Since the franchise's inception,  players have made an appearance in a competitive game for the team, whether as an offensive player (batting and baserunning) or a defensive player (fielding, pitching, or both).

Thirty-two players in Phillies history have been inducted into the Baseball Hall of Fame. Those players for whom the Hall recognizes the Phillies as their primary team include Grover Cleveland Alexander, Richie Ashburn, Dave Bancroft, Steve Carlton, Ed Delahanty, Billy Hamilton, Chuck Klein, Robin Roberts, Mike Schmidt, and Sam Thompson; manager Harry Wright was also inducted for his contributions with the club. The Phillies have retired numbers for seven players, including Schmidt (#20), Carlton (#32), Ashburn (#1), Roberts (#36),  Allen (#15), Halladay (#34), and Jim Bunning (#14); the eighth retired number is Jackie Robinson's #42, which was retired throughout baseball in 1997. The Phillies also honor two additional players with the letter "P" in the manner of a retired number: Alexander played before numbers were used in the major leagues; and Klein wore a variety of numbers in his Phillies career.

Forty Phillies players have been elected to the Philadelphia Baseball Wall of Fame. All of the players listed above (save Robinson) have been elected; also included are Bobby Abreu, Dick Allen, Bob Boone, Larry Bowa, Pat Burrell, Johnny Callison, Gavvy Cravath, Darren Daulton, Del Ennis, Jimmie Foxx, Dallas Green, Granny Hamner, Willie Jones, John Kruk, Mike Lieberthal, Greg Luzinski, Garry Maddox, Sherry Magee, Tug McGraw, Juan Samuel, Curt Schilling, Bobby Shantz, Chris Short, Curt Simmons, Tony Taylor, Jim Thome, Manny Trillo, John Vukovich, and Cy Williams. Foxx and Shantz were inducted for their contributions as members of the Philadelphia Athletics. Four non-players are also members of the Wall of Fame for their contributions to the Phillies: team executive Paul Owens, broadcaster Harry Kalas, manager Charlie Manuel and general manager Pat Gillick.

See also

List of Philadelphia Phillies managers
List of Philadelphia Phillies broadcasters

Footnotes

Key
For the purpose of this list, all non-pitching positions, including pinch hitters and pinch runners, are included in this tally.

Table
One player, Bert Conn, was both a pitcher and a second baseman.
One player, Ed Daily, was both a pitcher and an outfielder.
Two Phillies played as pitchers and position players; Harry Felix was both a pitcher and a third baseman, and Patsy Flaherty played center field in addition to pitching.
One player, Kid Gleason, was both a pitcher and a second baseman.
Two Phillies played as pitchers and position players; Bill Harman was both a catcher and a pitcher, and Hardie Henderson played left field in addition to pitching.
One player, Johnny Lush, was both a pitcher and a first baseman.
Two Phillies played as pitchers and position players; Al Maul was both a left fielder and a pitcher, and Elmer Miller played right field in addition to pitching.
One player, Jack Neagle, was both a pitcher and a left fielder.
Two Phillies played as pitchers and position players; Edgar Smith was both a left fielder and a pitcher, and John Strike played right field in addition to pitching.
One player, Bucky Walters, was both a pitcher and a third baseman.
The eighth retired number is 42, retired throughout Major League Baseball in honor of Jackie Robinson.

References
General

Inline citations

 

Major League Baseball all-time rosters
Roster
Philadelphia Phillies roster